This is a list of the 100 highest mountains in Scotland by elevation.

List of 100 highest mountains in Scotland 
Mountains are ranked by height and by prominence via Simms classification (DoBIH, October 2018).

See also 

 Mountains and hills of Scotland

References 

Climbing areas of Scotland
Lists of mountains and hills of Scotland
Scotland